The Lok Sabha (House of the People) is the lower house in the Parliament of India. The 6th Lok Sabha, which ran from 23 March 1977 to 22 August 1979 was elected in February and March 1977. 11 sitting members from Rajya Sabha were elected to 6th Lok Sabha after the 1971 Indian general election.

Morarji Desai became the Prime Minister on 24 March 1977 after Janata alliance won 345 seats, 233 more than the previous 5th Lok Sabha.

Charan Singh became the Prime Minister on 28 July 1979 with the support of Indira Gandhi (Congress (I)); but resigned on 20 August 1979 since he was not ready to remove charges against Indira Gandhi and her family from the Emergency days and advised the President to dissolve the Lok Sabha.  The Sixth Lok Sabha was dissolved on 22 August 1979 by the President Neelam Sanjiva Reddy and Charan Singh remained as the caretaker Prime Minister till 14 January 1980, the formation of the next 7th Lok Sabha following the 1980 Indian general election.

Important members
 Speaker:
N. Sanjiva Reddy from 26 March 1977 to 13 July 1977
K. S. Hegde from 21 July 1977 to 21 January 1980
 Deputy Speaker:
Godey Murahari from 1 April 1977 to 22 August 1979
Secretary General:
Avtar Singh Rikhy from 18 June 1977 to 31 December 1983

List of members by political party

Members by political party in 6th Lok Sabha are given below-

Cabinet

See also 
1977 Indian general election

References

External links

 6th Lok Sabha Members Official listings
 Lok Sabha website

 Terms of the Lok Sabha
India MPs 1977–1979
1977 establishments in India
1980 disestablishments in India